Ryan Deitsch (born November 30, 1999) is an American student activist against gun violence, and a survivor of the Parkland massacre. He is a founding member of the Never Again MSD movement.

Early life and education 
Ryan Deitsch was born on November 30, 1999, into a Jewish family. He is the younger brother of filmmaker Matt Deitsch. He started attending Marjory Stoneman Douglas High School in 2014 and graduated in 2018. after taking a gap year to conduct gun violence prevention activism, he currently attends American University in Washington, D.C. Ryan is majoring in International Service and is expected to graduate by May 2023.

Stoneman Douglas High School shooting 
Deitsch filmed the active Stoneman Douglas High School massacre from inside the school, which occurred on his senior year there, and was saved as he hid with other students in a closet during the event. Deitsch has criticized the media for sensationalizing shooters, and has encouraged supporters to be a part of protests and marches. On February 21, 2018 he was a part of a CNN town hall with lawmakers, asking senator Marco Rubio the question, "Why do we have to march ... to save innocent lives?" Deitsch was featured in a Harvard Political Review interview, along with Cameron Kasky, and David Hogg.

References

External links 
Ryan Deitsch on Twitter

Stoneman Douglas High School shooting activists
Living people
1999 births
American gun control activists
American Jews
Gun politics in the United States
American shooting survivors
Place of birth missing (living people)